Into (Enthusiasm) is the fourth studio album by the Finnish rock band The Rasmus (after Peep, Playboys and Hell of a Tester), and the first studio album to be released under the name "The Rasmus". It was originally released on October 29, 2001 by Playground Music.

It is the band's first studio album with their new drummer Aki Hakala, who replaced Janne Heiskanen in 1999. The (international only) singles taken from it were "F-F-F-Falling", "Chill", "Madness" and "Heartbreaker/Days". All of these were released in 2001 apart from Heartbreaker/Days, which was released in 2002. For this fact and the name's change, some fans consider this album the first of "The Rasmus".

The album has sold double platinum in Finland and was the first album by The Rasmus to be released in other European countries such as France and Spain. They won four EMMAs in 2002 (the Finnish equivalent of Grammys) for Best Group, Best Album, Best Pop/Rock Album and Best Song (for "F-F-F-Falling").

On February 20, 2007, the album (Special Edition) was for the first time released in the United States by the record label DRT Entertainment. It did not contain any extra tracks.

Musical style
With Into, The Rasmus continue to move away from the funk rock sound of their early albums. The mood of this album is more melancholic than that of Hell of a Tester and synthesizers play a more prominent role.

Track listing

Special Edition 
A special edition of Into in digipak was released on November 5, 2003 by Playground Music Scandinavia/Edel Music. It contained the ten original songs plus four bonus tracks (Days, Can't Stop Me, Used to Feel Before and a cover of Björk's Play Dead) and the video of "F-F-F-Falling". It had a 24-page booklet with new photos of the band. The whole album were in black and white, and not in orange as the original version.

Music videos

F-F-F-Falling (2001) 
The first video of Into was "F-F-F-Falling". The video shows the members of The Rasmus dressed in a beach-like clothes, and Lauri Ylönen using skater pads, playing the song in an apartment that looks like a recording studio. The video also shows a girl that met her friend (also a girl) at a train station, making her very happy. The girls spend time together, listening to music in a shop (that appears to be the song that The Rasmus plays in the apartment) and playing on a bus. Later they become more crazy and change clothes in the same place, go to the toilet in the street, dance everywhere, and kiss in a car, to the point that they kiss in the bed of the first girl, leading to them sleeping together. In the morning, the girl thinks about what she has done and looks like she regrets her actions. The members of the band, in some parts, look pained about what happens to the girls. One of the girls was Pauli's girlfriend.

Chill (2001) 
The second video, "Chill", shows the band in a tour bus, taking photos and playing with some acoustic instruments. The video shows often the vocalist Lauri singing in the road. The video also shows some photos and mini-videos of the band in the streets.

Singles 
The first single of the Into album was "F-F-F-Falling", released on April 2, 2001. It was #1 in Finland for three months in early 2001.
Their second single (released on June 18, 2001) was "Chill", a very popular song and singer Lauri Ylönen's favorite. It reached #2 in Finland.

Later, two other singles were released:
"Madness" (September 3, 2001) and Heartbreaker/Days (March 11, 2002), but without new videos. "Heartbreaker" went into the Finnish charts at #2 but moved up to #1 after a week.

Some of the singles from the album contained non-album tracks which later were released on Into (Special Edition) in 2003.

Credits
The Rasmus
 Lauri Ylönen – vocals
 Pauli Rantasalmi – Guitar
 Eero Heinonen – Bass
 Aki Hakala – drums

Additional personnel
 Jörgen Ingeström – Strings
 Martin Hansen & Mikael Nord – Producing, Recording, Programming, keyboards & additional sounds
 Leif Allansson – Mixing
 Claes Persson – Mastering
 Henrik Walse – Design
 Jeanette Fredenburg & Lars Tengroth – Photos

Charts and certifications

Weekly charts

Year-end charts

|-

|-

|-

Certifications

References

External links
 Into on Playground Music

The Rasmus albums
2001 albums